Shaji Kumar is an Indian cinematographer, who has worked in the Malayalam and Tamil film industries.

Career
Shaji Kumar began his career as a cinematographer for Malayalam films, He has frequently collaborated with leading Indian filmmakers like Shaji Kailas, Joshiy, Vinayan and Vysakh, before moving on to balance those commitments alongside Tamil films. In the Tamil film industry, Shaji has extensively collaborated with actor Prashanth for his films. Shaji received critical acclaim for his work in Ponnar Shankar (2011), while he also shot Mambattiyan (2011) and Saahasam (2016).

Filmography

Uthaman (2001)
Valkannadi(2002)
Pakalppooram (2002)
Kanmashi (2002)
Ammakilikkoodu (2003)
Pattanathil Sundaran (2003)
Njan Salperu Ramankutty (2004)
Vellinakshatram (2004)
Sathyam (2004)
Vesham (2004)
Athbhutha Dweepu (2005)
Naran (2005)
Yes Your Honour (2006)
Mahha Samudram (2006)
Baba Kalyani (2006)
July 4 (2007)
Nasrani (2007)
Cycle (2008)
Veruthe Oru Bharya (2008)
Robin Hood: Prince of Thieves (2009)
Red Chillies (2009)
Pokkiri Raja (2010)
Kanagavel Kaaka (2010)
Toofan (2010)
Ponnar Shankar (2011)
Seniors (2011)
Doctor Love (2011)
Mambattiyan (2011)
The King & the Commissioner (2012)
Mallu Singh (2012)
Madirasi (2012)
Simhasanam (2012)
Sringaravelan (2013)
Sound Thoma (2013)
 Rajadhi Raja (2014)
Ring Master (2014)
Cousins (2014 film)
Saahasam (2016)
Pulimurugan (2016)
Ramaleela (2017)
Mohanlal (2018)
Odiyan (2018)
Madhura Raja (2019)
Ittymaani: Made in China (2019)
Night Drive (2022)
Pathonpatham Noottandu (2022)
Bandra (2023)
Bruce Lee (2023)

Awards
Asiavision Awards
 2016: Best Cinematographer – Pulimurugan

References

External links
 

Living people
Artists from Kochi
Tamil film cinematographers
Malayalam film cinematographers
21st-century Indian photographers
Cinematographers from Kerala
Year of birth missing (living people)